Kapp Linné is a cape at the south side of the outlet of Isfjorden on Spitsbergen, Svalbard. It is named after botanist Carl von Linné. The site is the location of Isfjord Radio. Parts of Kapp Linné is a birdlife protected area.

See also
List of lighthouses in Svalbard

References

Lighthouses in Svalbard
Headlands of Spitsbergen